The Central Committee of the 20th Congress of the Communist Party of the Soviet Union was in session from 1956 until 1961. It elected, at its 1st Plenary Session, the 20th Presidium, the 20th Secretariat and the 20th Party Control Committee of the Communist Party of the Soviet Union.

Plenums
The Central Committee was not a permanent institution. It convened plenary sessions. 19 CC plenary sessions were held between the 20th Congress and the 22nd Congress. When the CC was not in session, decision-making power was vested in the internal bodies of the CC itself; that is, the Politburo and the Secretariat. None of these bodies were permanent either; typically they convened several times a month.

Composition

Members

Candidates

References

Citations

Bibliography
 

Central Committee of the Communist Party of the Soviet Union
1956 establishments in the Soviet Union
1961 disestablishments in the Soviet Union